In the Wilderness may refer to:
In the Wilderness (Warner book), 1878 book by Charles Dudley Warner
In the Wilderness (Undset book), 1995 book by Sigrid Undset
In the Wilderness (1917 novel), 1917 book by Robert Hichens
In the Wilderness (Fare book), 1913 book by John Thomas Fare
In the Wilderness (film), 1910 short starring Margarita Fischer
In the Wilderness: Coming of Age in Unknown Country, 1997 book by Kim Barnes
In the Wilderness: The Doctrine of Defilement in the Book of Numbers, 2001 book by Mary Douglas
In the Wilderness: And other poems, 1969 book by James Simmons
In the Wilderness: Stories, 1969 book by Aron Appelfeld

See also
Bamidbar (disambiguation), Hebrew for In the Wilderness